The Jacuípe River is a river along the border between Alagoas and Pernambuco states in eastern Brazil. It flows into the Una River on the border of Barreiros and Água Preta municipalities in the latter state.

See also
List of rivers of Alagoas
List of rivers of Pernambuco

References
Brazilian Ministry of Transport

Rivers of Alagoas
Rivers of Pernambuco